Pandemos is a monotypic genus of butterflies in the family Riodinidae. Its sole species, Pandemos pasiphae, is found in South America.

References

Butterflies described in 1775
Nymphidiini
Riodinidae of South America
Taxa named by Pieter Cramer